Ievgenii Bogodaiko (born 27 April 1994) is a Paralympic swimmer from Ukraine competing mainly in category SB6 and S7 events.

References

1994 births
Living people
Ukrainian male medley swimmers
S7-classified Paralympic swimmers
Paralympic swimmers of Ukraine
Paralympic gold medalists for Ukraine
Paralympic silver medalists for Ukraine
Paralympic bronze medalists for Ukraine
Swimmers at the 2012 Summer Paralympics
Swimmers at the 2016 Summer Paralympics
Swimmers at the 2020 Summer Paralympics
Medalists at the 2012 Summer Paralympics
Medalists at the 2016 Summer Paralympics
Medalists at the 2020 Summer Paralympics
Medalists at the World Para Swimming Championships
Medalists at the World Para Swimming European Championships
Sportspeople from Poltava
Paralympic medalists in swimming
Ukrainian male backstroke swimmers
Ukrainian male breaststroke swimmers
21st-century Ukrainian people